The Saudi Arabia national ice hockey team is the national men's ice hockey team of the Kingdom of Saudi Arabia. Saudi Arabia is not a member of the IIHF and therefore not eligible to enter any IIHF World Championship events.

History
The Saudi Arabian Nationals first played ice hockey in the early 1990s. Ice hockey was played in Riyadh at the Fal Shopping Centre Ice Rink, a rink 1/3 the size of a standard North American-sized ice rink. In 1994, five Saudis were part of a team consisting of mostly ex-pats from Canada and Finland. This particular team was the winner of the Canuck Cup held in Dubai. A member of the team was Prince Ahmed Al Saud. A fan of hockey after watching it played in New York. Saudi Arabia played its first game in 2010 during the Gulf Ice Hockey Championship which was held in Kuwait City, Kuwait. Saudi Arabia played three games losing its opener against Kuwait 10–3. In their second game in the tournament, Saudi Arabia was beaten by a larger margin then the first, losing to the United Arab Emirates 14–1. In their final game of the tournament, they won their first ever international game after they defeated Oman 3–1. Saudi Arabia finished third in the four team tournament with the UAE winning gold. Saudi Arabia has not been active until the 2022 GCC Games.

Tournament record

GCC Gulf Championship

GCC Games

All-time record against other nations
Last match update: 26 May 2022

References

National ice hockey teams in the Arab world
National ice hockey teams in Asia
Ice hockey